Joel Fagliano (born 1992) is an American puzzle creator. He is known for his work on the New York Times crossword puzzles, where he writes the paper's "Mini Crossword".

Early life and education
Fagliano grew up in the Mount Airy neighborhood of Philadelphia, Pennsylvania, in a Jewish family with two brothers. His mother is a grant writer and his father is a chairperson at the Drexel University School of Public Health. He enjoyed puzzles as a child, began completing the New York Times crossword puzzle regularly during his freshman year of high school at the Masterman School, a magnet school, and began making his own crosswords in his sophomore year. For college, he moved to Southern California to attend Pomona College, where he graduated in 2014 with a degree in linguistics and cognitive science.

Career
Fagliano started submitting standard-length crossword puzzles to the New York Times in 2007. His first puzzle was accepted in September 2009 and ran the next month, when he was 17 years old. By the time he finished high school, he had had four puzzles accepted and published by the Times and two accepted and published by the Los Angeles Times Syndicate. He interned for three summers with Will Shortz, the Times crossword puzzle editor. After graduating from Pomona in 2014, Fagliano began working for him full-time.

Personal life 
Fagliano lives in the Upper East Side in Manhattan, New York City. His hobbies include playing chess and basketball, watching sports, and jogging.

References

Crossword compilers
The New York Times editors
Pomona College alumni
1992 births
Living people
Writers from Philadelphia
People from the Upper East Side